Mount Gugu is a mountain in central Ethiopia. It forms part of the divide between the drainage basins of the Awash and the Shebelle rivers.

References

Gugu
Ethiopian Highlands
Geography of Oromia Region